Al Melcher (September 3, 1884 Dalton, Illinois – October 28, 1944 Los Angeles, California) was an American racecar driver.

Racing career 
Melcher competed in 18 AAA Championship Car races from 1919 to 1927. He competed nearly full-time on the board tracks in 1927 and made his only Indianapolis 500 start that year as well. He finished 12th in points with a best finish of 2nd on the 1.5-mile Atlantic City Speedway board oval.

Indy 500 results

References

Indianapolis 500 drivers
1884 births
1944 deaths
AAA Championship Car drivers
Racing drivers from Illinois